Centromere protein R is a protein that in humans is encoded by the ITGB3BP gene.

Interactions
ITGB3BP has been shown to interact with:
 CD61,
 Cyclin A2, 
 NFKB1, 
 RXRA,
 RXRG, and
 THRA.

References

Further reading